Her Night of Nights is a 1922 American silent comedy film directed by Hobart Henley and written by Doris Schroeder. The film stars Marie Prevost, Edward Hearn, Hallam Cooley, Betty Francisco, Charles Arling, and Jane Starr. The film was released on June 26, 1922, by Universal Film Manufacturing Company.

Cast          
Marie Prevost as Molly May Mahone
Edward Hearn as Jerry Trimble
Hallam Cooley as Ted Bradley 
Betty Francisco as Myone Madrigal
Charles Arling as Cyrus Bradley
Jane Starr as Lily Everson
George B. Williams as Gus Wimple
William Robert Daly as Pop Mahone
Richard Daniels as Micky Dennis Mahone

References

External links

1922 films
1920s English-language films
Silent American comedy films
Universal Pictures films
Films directed by Hobart Henley
American silent feature films
American black-and-white films
1922 comedy films
1920s American films